Jayathilake Arachchige Florida Cooray (born 1936 – died 2007 as ෆ්ලොරිඩා ජයලත්) [Sinhala]), popularly as Florida Jayalath, was an actress in Sri Lankan cinema. Apart from acting, Florida also worked as a filmmaker, choreographer and a film producer. She is the first female filmmaker in Sinhala film industry.

Personal life
Florida was born on 1936 in Marawila as the fourth child of the family. Her father was D. K. Jayalath and mother was Merry Gald Jayalath. She completed education from Holy Family Convent, Marawila. She has two elder sisters, Josapin Jayalath and Srima Murial Jayalath. Josapin was a dramatist at the Minerva Drama Team.

Florida died in April 2007 at the age of 71. At the time of demise, she was in Melbourne, Australia with her daughter.

Career
Florida made her film debut with a minor role in the 1951 film Segawunu Pilithura.  Then in 1953, she made a major role in the film Sujatha with the titular character. The film was a blockbuster of that year and Florida became a sensation among the people. She appeared in many popular movies in the coming years such as Sada Sulang, Daruwa Kageda and Heta Pramada Wadi. In the film Seda Sulang, Indian playback singer Lata Mangeshkar played the background song Sri Lanka Ma Priyadara for Florida.  Her last film appearance came through 1966 film Sudu Duwa. 

In 1965, she directed and produced the film Sweep Ticket along with Raja Joshua. This is the first time a woman in Sinhala cinema has directed a feature film.

Filmography

References

External links
 First Sri Lankan film that ban in screening

2007 deaths
Sri Lankan film actresses
Sinhalese actresses
1936 births